Aphodiites is a genus of fossil beetles from the Lias (Lower Jurassic) of Schambelen, (Aargau, Switzerland), and the oldest fossil in the superfamily Scarabaeoidea. Its affinities are not clear; it was originally placed in the Aphodiinae (Scarabaeidae), but its diagnostic characters are shared by beetles such as Glaresis (Glaresidae).

References

Prehistoric beetle genera
†
Early Jurassic insects
Fossil taxa described in 1865
Prehistoric insects of Europe